Joyce Herrín Reintegrado-Egbalic, popularly known by her screen name Joyce Jimenez (born March 21, 1978) is an American-born Filipino former actress who stars in movies in the Philippines.

In the early 2000s, Joyce Jimenez was titled "Pantasya ng Bayan" (The nation's fantasy) after doing sexy films that did well at the box office under VIVA Films she worked with serious actors such as Richard Gomez, Albert Martinez and Jomari Yllana, later on in romantic comedies with Piolo Pascual and Diether Ocampo under Regal Films. In 2003, she was cast in Pinay Pie with Ai-Ai delas Alas and Assunta De Rossi under Star Cinema on her second film with Jose Javier Reyes after her pairing with Aga Muhlach in Narinig Mo Na Ba ang L8est?.

After her retirement in film and her regular television work for GMA Network at the time, she decided to go back to Los Angeles after marrying and started a family. Her Ever Bilena brand Private Joyce disbanded in 2006.

Biography
Joyce Jimenez was born in Los Angeles, California to Filipino migrant parents. Her full name is Joyce Herrín Reintegrado-Egbalic. Jimenez grew up in the Los Ángeles area where she studied at Bishop Amat High School in La Puente, California. She was accepted at UCLA but decided to forgo schooling to move to the Philippines; most recently she had a college degree from a university in Australia.

In 1996, Jimenez participated in the Miss Taguig - Hollywood pageant. Although she did not win the title, she did win the Miss Photogenic title.

Jimenez started to venture out from films and into business. She owns Skin-Private Joyce, which specializes in bath and beauty products. She also opened a lingerie line Private Joyce Intimate Collection partnership with Ever Bilena Cosmetics Inc. Jimenez married Filipino-American Paul Ely Egbalic from Vallejo, CA on August 23, 2008, at Walnut, California and on October 16, 2009, Joyce & Paul welcomed their first baby girl named "Jorja".

On September 29, 2008, Jimenez suffered serious injuries in a car accident in Urdaneta City, Pangasinan (coming from a Baguio taping for ABC TV5's "Philippines Scariest Challenge"). Avoiding a truck, her Toyota 4Runner flipped four times and was totally wrecked when it rolled over in a rice field. She was treated at the Urdaneta City Sacred Heart Hospital and transferred to Medical City, Pasig. Her legs were badly injured, she had minor bruises, had to wear a brace on her neck, and had minor stitches on her face.

Filmography

Movies

Television

Awards

References

External links

1978 births
Living people
Actresses from Los Angeles
American actresses of Filipino descent
American emigrants to the Philippines
Filipino film actresses
Filipino television actresses
Filipino television personalities